System Rush is a futuristic racing game for the Nokia N-Gage platform. It was released in 2005 and available Worldwide through leading retailers.

Story
In a world controlled by corporations, information is everything. Knowing that your competitors' secrets is the only way to get an edge in the cutthroat arena of corporate dominance. In this information age, warfare is carried out by "black hat" (morally corrupt) hackers who have become electronic gladiators for their boardroom puppet masters.

You are a "white hat" hacker on the verge of being framed for a high-profile global cyber-crime. Your sophisticated program, designed to cleanse any network of malicious hacker activity, has been stolen by black hat hackers on the payroll of Globenet. A network of unscrupulous corporations. This evil alliance intends to use your code as a "logic bomb" to bring down rival corporations.

Your only chance at clearing your name is to infiltrate Globenet, steal back your code and expose the conspiracy.

Features
System Rush can be played both as a single-player game and in a multi-player mode, using either N-Gage Arena or a local Bluetooth connection. As of December 2007 the Arena functions are now defunct.

Developments
System Rush was an original concept by Ideaworks Game Studio who also developed the game.

Reception

The game received "favorable" reviews according to the review aggregation website Metacritic.

Sequel
Nokia released the follow-up System Rush: Evolution, which was also developed by Ideaworks Game Studio on the Nokia N93 and N95. System Rush: Evolution is the sequel for N-Gage 2.0 mobile gaming devices, featuring better graphics, a new story, and new game types (there are three in total; racing, shooting and flying). It was announced on 10 May 2006. As of February 4, 2008, this sequel/remake can also be played on the N81 by downloading and installing the new N-Gage 2.0 platform.

References

External links
 Website in the Webrchive

External links
 
 System Rush: Evolution at N-Gage.com

2005 video games
Cyberpunk video games
Hacking video games
N-Gage games
N-Gage service games
Racing video games
Video games developed in the United Kingdom
Nokia games